New Jersey Board of Higher Education v. Shelton College, 90 N.J. 470 (1982), 448 A.2d 988, is a New Jersey Supreme Court case regarding state regulation of religious schools which grant academic degrees. The Court held that religious schools are prohibited from granting degrees without a state license.

References

External links

New Jersey state case law
Supreme Court of New Jersey
1982 in United States case law